is the 27th single by the Japanese girl idol group Berryz Kobo. It was released in Japan on August 10, 2011, and debuted at number 7 on the Oricon weekly CD singles chart.

Track listings

CD single 
 
 
 "Ā, Yo ga Akeru" (Instrumental)

 Limited Edition A DVD
 "Ā, Yo ga Akeru" (Dance Shot Ver.)
 
 Limited Edition B DVD
 "Ā, Yo ga Akeru" (Close-up Ver.)

DVD single Event V "Ā, Yo ga Akeru" 
 "Ā, Yo ga Akeru" (Shimizu Saki Close-up Ver.)
 "Ā, Yo ga Akeru" (Tsugunaga Momoko Close-up Ver.)
 "Ā, Yo ga Akeru" (Tokunaga Chinami Close-up Ver.)
 "Ā, Yo ga Akeru" (Sudo Maasa Close-up Ver.)
 "Ā, Yo ga Akeru" (Natsuyaki Miyabi Close-up Ver.)
 "Ā, Yo ga Akeru" (Kumai Yurina Close-up Ver.)
 "Ā, Yo ga Akeru" (Sugaya Risako Close-up Ver.)

Charts

References

External links 
 Profile on the Up-Front Works official website

2011 singles
2011 songs
Japanese-language songs
Berryz Kobo songs
Songs written by Tsunku
Piccolo Town singles